Oswald Stevens Nock, B. Sc., DIC, C. Eng, M.I.C.E., M.I.Mech.E., M.I.Loco.E., (21 January 1905 – 29 September 1994), nicknamed Ossie, was a British railway signal engineer and senior manager at the Westinghouse company; he is well known for his prodigious output of popularist publications on railway subjects, including over 100 books, as well as many more technical works on locomotive performance.

He authored articles on railway signalling and locomotive performance for The Engineer researched during World War II, and from 1958 to 1980 he succeeded Cecil J. Allen as the author of the "British locomotive practice and performance" series published in The Railway Magazine.

Biography
Oswald Stevens Nock was born 21 January 1905 in Sutton Coldfield, Warwickshire, the son of a bank employee, Samuel James Nock, and a schoolteacher Rose Amy née Stevens. In early childhood Nock's father became manager of a bank branch in Reading; O.S. Nock was subsequently educated at Marlborough House, and Reading School. After the family moved to Barrow in Furness in 1916 he became a boarder at Giggleswick School. In 1921 he enrolled at the City and Guilds Engineering College, in London, and obtained a degree in engineering in 1924, and joined the Westinghouse Brake and Signal Company in 1925.

Recession during the 1930s (see Great Depression in the United Kingdom) led Nock to seek other forms of income, and after having taken a correspondence course in journalism, began to submit articles to magazines. His first submission was a technical paper on railways submitted to the Institution of Mechanical Engineers. In 1932 he had his first works accepted for publication: the first was an article "Carlisle, a Station of Changes" published in January 1932 in The Railway Magazine, also in 1932 the London Evening News bought and published an article written as part of his journalism correspondence course: "Hyde Park's ghost trains"; Due to his moonlighting as a journalist, he published under pseudonyms including "C.K.S", "C.K. Stevens" or "Railway Engineer".

In his early writing career Nock also had published photographic articles on landscapes and regions, published by non-railway publications. A commission for The Star newspaper enabled him to ride on the footplate of a LMS express locomotive in 1934, subsequently he regularly submitted information on locomotive performance to The Railway Magazine.

Nock married Olivia Hattie née Ravenall (1913–1987) in 1937. By 1939 Nock was successful as a both a popular and technical railway author – he received a commission by The Engineer at the beginning of the Second World War to produce a series of articles on railway signalling, and on locomotive performance under wartime conditions.

After World War II Nock rose through the Westinghouse organisation to become chief brake draughtsman (1945), four years later chief draughtsman; during the British Rail modernisation plan (1955) Nock managed the expansion of the company's drawing office, and in 1957 became the company's chief mechanical engineer. Nock's first published book was Locomotives of Sir Nigel Gresley published 1945, and based on an earlier series of ten articles in The Railway Magazine; he became a regular author of publishers David and Charles and Ian Allan in the post war boom, publishing on average two books per year whilst working at Westinghouse. In 1959 he took over the writing of the "British locomotive practice and performance" reports for The Railway Magazine from Cecil J. Allen, publishing 264 articles between then and 1980.

In 1967 he was a passenger on a train involved in a derailment near Didcot in which one person was killed. The carriage where he was sitting overturned, but he escaped without injury, and later wrote of his experience in his book Historic Railway Disasters. He had previously seen the aftermath of another fatal railway accident at Reading in 1914 as a schoolboy.

In 1969 Nock became president of the Institution of Railway Signal Engineers (IRSE). After retiring in 1970 his output rose to five books per year, including a three volume work on 20th century British locomotives, and eight volumes on the railways of regions of the world.

In addition to his interests in all things railway, Nock's interests included photography, painting, as well as railway modelling.

His wife Olivia died in 1987. He died 21 September 1994.

Legacy
Nock authored more than 140 books and 1000 magazine articles, although some of the work represented duplication from his own oeuvre, as well as containing repetition or padding within the text. Much of his work showed a bias towards locomotive performance issues; his most authoritative work was on that subject and on signalling. As a writer his output is considered accessible, uncontroversial, and empathic to the subject he wrote upon, and rich in personal anecdotes, though some feel his historical work and research was weak.

His better writing has been highly praised:

Partial bibliography

Books

Signalling

Locomotives and performance

 
 
 

 
 
 
Railways

 , Revised edition (1982) , 
 
 
 
 
 

 , 2nd edition (1964) , 3rd edition (1973)  
 
 
 
 
 
  original publisher: Artists House, London

Autobiography

Articles and monographs

Signalling
, in four parts: No.I, 27 August, pp. 162–165; No.II, 3 September, pp. 190–193; No.III, 10 September, pp. 202–205; No.IV, 17 September, pp. 228–231 

, in four parts: No.I, 13 May 1949, pp. 518–521, No.II, 20 May 1949, pp. 546–548, No. III, 27 May 1949, pp. 574–578, No. IV, 3 June 1949, pp. 602–605

Locomotives and performance
, in two parts: No.I, 6 February, pp. 110–113; No.II, 13 February, pp. 132–134

: Part I, 26 April 1946, pp. 374–375, Part II, 3 May 1946, pp. 398–399
: Part I, 24 May 1946, pp. 466–467, Part II, 31 May 1946, pp. 490–491, Part III, 19 July 1946, pp. 60–62

: Part I, 13 December 1946, pp. 532–534, Part II, 20 December 1946, pp. 558–559
: Part I, 6 February 1948, pp. 128–130, Part II, 13 February 1948, pp. 152–154
 
Part I.: The G.W.R. "Hall" Class. 4 November 1949, pp. 514–517, 
Part II: The Ex-L.M.S.R. Class "5". 11 November 1949, pp. 543–546
Part III: The Ex-L.N.E.R. "B.1" Class. 18 November 1949, pp. 573–576
Part IV: The G.W.R. "County" Class. 25 November 1949, pp. 600–603
:Part I, 20 April 1951, pp. 501–503, Part II, 27 April 1951, pp. 535–539

: Part I, 18 July 1952, pp. 77–80, Part II, 25 July 1952, pp. 115–117
: Part I, 29 May 1953, pp. 754–756, Part II, 5 June 1953, pp. 786-
: Part I, 10 July 1953, pp. 34–36, Part II, 17 July 1953, pp. 66–68
: Part 1, 2 July 1954, pp. 2–4, Part II, 9 July 1954, pp. 38–41
: Part 1, 20 August 1954, pp. 268–270, part II, 27 August 1954, pp. 284–286
 No.I, 25 May 1956, pp. 550–553, No.II, 1 June 1956, pp. 588–591

: 

 
: No.I, 13 June 1952, pp. 788–790, No.II, 20 June 1952, pp. 817–820, No.III, 4 July 1952, pp. 29–31, No.IV, 11 July 1952, pp. 62–64 
 No.I, 24 July 1953, pp. 103–104, No.II, 31 July 1953, pp. 136–138
 No.I, 2 October 1953, pp. 424–427, No.II, 9 October 1953, pp. 451–453
 No.I, 5 February 1953, pp. 202–205, No.II, 12 February 1954, pp. 236–239

 No.I, 15 July 1955, pp. 66–68, No.II, 22 July 1955, pp. 102–104
 No.I, 4 November 1955, pp. 644–646, No.II, 11 November 1955, pp. 680–682
 No.I, 12 April 1957, pp. 560–562, No.II, 19 April 1957, pp. 594–597
 No.I, 23 August 1957, pp. 258–261, No.II, 30 August 1957, pp. 292–294

References

Sources

O. S. Nock." Times [London, England] 8 Oct. 1994: 23. The Times Digital Archive. Web. 18 Nov. 2016

Notes

External links
 O. S. Nock at WorldCat

1905 births
1994 deaths
People educated at Giggleswick School
People from Sutton Coldfield
Rail transport writers
Railway historians
20th-century English historians